Pie in the Sky is a 1964 American film drama written and directed by Allen Baron and starring Lee Grant, Sylvia Miles, and youngster Richard Bray (his only film work). Although filmed in 1962, financial and distribution problems delayed release until 1964. Shortly after the initial release, it was retitled Terror in the City.

Plot
A nine-year-old boy, Brill (Richard Bray), who lives on a farm, hitchhikes to New York City. He finds work selling papers with a gang of shoeshine boys and paper carriers managed by teen punk Rick (Jaime Charlamagne), who keeps half their earnings. Brill wins Rick's money in a crap game, and he goes on the town with his Puerto Rican friend Paco (Roberto Marsach).

When Rick's gang gives Brill a beating, prostitute Suzy (Lee Grant) takes care of Brill, buys him new clothes and takes him on a tour of Manhattan. After Suzy is picked up by the police, Brill buys a bicycle to ride back to the farm. However, a truck ruins the bicycle on the highway, and he stays the night at the home of an elderly African-American couple. Back home the next day, he gives his father the rest of his money.

Cast
Lee Grant as Suzy
Richard Bray as Brill
Michael Higgins as Carl
Robert Marsach as Paco
Robert Allen as Brill's Father
Sylvia Miles as Rose
Ruth Attaway as Farmer's Wife
Robert Earl Jones as Farmer

References

External links

1964 films
1964 drama films
American drama films
1960s English-language films
1960s American films